Sucka Free is the second mixtape by rapper Nicki Minaj. It was released on April 12, 2008, through Dirty Money Records. Sucka Free features guest appearances from fellow rappers Lil Wayne, Gucci Mane, Jadakiss, Lil' Kim and Ransom. Production derives from Daven "Prestige" Vanderpool, Diddy, James Todd Smith, among others. None of the tracks have original instrumentals, using other productions of popular hip hop records.

Background 
Just after Minaj's previous mixtape, Playtime Is Over, was released in 2007, Minaj released Sucka Free with label mate Lil Wayne after he discovered her on the Queens-made DVD series called The Come Up.

Artwork 
The cover of this tape shows Nicki Minaj and Lil Wayne at a podium in front of a red curtain being interviewed by XXL and MTV. Minaj is wearing a gold-colored necklace and earrings, a halfway buttoned down red shirt, and striped pants similar to the ones she is wearing on the Playtime Is Over mixtape. Lil Wayne is wearing a red garment with a silver watch and silver chains, with a black hat titled "Young Money".

Lil' Kim controversy 
In a promotional photo for the mixtape, Minaj paid homage to that of rapper Lil' Kim's debut album photoshoot, Hard Core causing Kim to express anger on Twitter. Despite Minaj calling Kim an "influence" early in her career, tensions rose between the two females with Kim calling Minaj "catty" and accused her of copying her image saying, "If you are going to steal my swag, you gonna have to pay. Something gotta give. You help me, I help you. That's how it goes to me."

Minaj responded to the situation in an interview on The Angie Martinez Show saying "She picked a fight with Foxy, then she picked a fight with Eve, then she picked a fight with Remy, then it was Mrs. Wallace, then it was Nicki Minaj", said Minaj. "Every time you in the news, it's 'cause you gettin' at somebody! Where's your music? Put your music out, and when I see your name on Billboard, that's when I'll respond to you. Other than that, goodbye. It's Barbie, bitch." Minaj also went on to respond to Kim on "Roman's Revenge," a song from her debut album, in 2010 with Eminem.

Critical reception 

In a 2014 article, NME described the mixtape as Minaj's bang "on the door of hip-hop’s boys club" and was described as "explosive". Although Minaj jumped on a "load of popular hip hop instrumentals", she successfully made every track feel like her own.

Minaj's remix of Eminem and The Notorious B.I.G.'s "Dead Wrong" was seen as a standout track from the mixtape which called in "comparisons to NYC rap legends like Notorious" and eventually continued by Minaj in her third studio album, The Pinkprint, on songs such as "Four Door Aventador". The song was also called a "triumph and an omen" in a Paper Magazine article, but that it was hardly comparable to Minaj's fourth studio album, Queen. With high praise response from critics, Minaj won an award for Female Artist of the Year at the 2008 Underground Music Awards.

Accolades 

|-
|rowspan="1"|2008
|Nicki Minaj
|Female Artist of the Year 
|
|}

Commercial performance
The mixtape debuted at number 95 on Billboard's Top R&B/Hip-Hop Albums, making it Minaj's first mixtape to chart.

Track listing

Charts

References 

2008 mixtape albums
Nicki Minaj albums